Ambulance LTD was an indie rock group formed in Spanish Harlem, New York City in 2000. The band was founded by Michael Di Liberto and David Longstreth from Cleveland OH. Marcus Congleton joined about a year later and continued on with their name and ideas with other members. They signed to TVT Records after getting positive reviews from their live shows and recorded their debut album LP on March 23, 2004 in the US and March 14, 2005 in the UK and went on to sell more than 100,000 copies worldwide.

The band mixes the genres of dream pop, indie rock and the British shoegazing movement of the late 1980s and early 1990s. Their influences range from the Beatles and the Rolling Stones to Spiritualized, My Bloody Valentine, and Elliott Smith. The band has said that "their niche is not sticking to any particular niche" and that they do not want to be stuck in any subgenre of rock.

An EP titled New English EP was released in March 2006.

After the defection of keyboardist Andrew Haskell shortly before their debut LP was released on TVT/Island, Matthew Dublin and Darren Beckett also left Ambulance LTD to form a band called The Red Romance with the addition of Adam Chilensk on bass, leaving Congleton as the only remaining member. Lysaght and Beckett went on to tour with such renowned stars as Father John Misty and Brandon Flowers.  Lysaght is credited with guitar credit on 8 of the 10 songs on Flowers 2015 album "Desired Effect" and writing credit on one. Dublin then went on to form Stranger Islands with Canadian actress Joanie Wolkoff. Congleton legally acquired ownership of the band name Ambulance LTD, and in 2007, Congleton was working with The Velvet Underground's John Cale in Los Angeles writing new material, none of which has officially surfaced.

In 2008, Ambulance LTD hired a backing band consisting of Ian Fenger on guitar, Xander McMahon on keyboards, and Jeremy Kay on bass. They went on tour with their first performance at Middle East Downstairs in Cambridge, Massachusetts on April 2, 2008. Ambulance LTD were prevented from releasing new material after TVT Records filed for Chapter 11 bankruptcy. TVT also attempted to sell artists' back catalog, resulting in Congleton, along with labelmates The Polyphonic Spree, to file a lawsuit against the label and its parent company Universal Music Group in June 2008.

Marcus Congleton now has a new band, Drug Cabin, with Nathan Thelen ex of Pretty Girls Make Graves and Moonrats.

Andrew Haskell, now based in his hometown of Washington D.C., continues to write, record, and perform under the name Hask. He released an EP in February 2022 called "The Difficult Year" on Kind Warrior.

Congleton also played with Pearl Charles.

Ambulance LTD reunited for shows on February 7 and 8, 2019 at New York's Mercury Lounge as part of the venue's 25th anniversary.

Band members
Current
 Marcus Congleton – vocals, guitar, songwriter

Former
 Michael Di Liberto – founder, guitar, bass, vocals
 Matthew Dublin – bass, backing vocals
 Darren Beckett – drums
 Andrew Haskell – keyboards, backing vocals
 Benji Lysaght – guitar

Discography

Studio albums
 LP (March 23, 2004)

EPs
 Ambulance LTD (June 17, 2003)
 New English EP (March 14, 2006)

Singles
 "Heavy Lifting" (December 13, 2004)
 "Stay Where You Are" (February 28, 2005) - UK No. 67
 "Primitive (The Way I Treat You)" (June 13, 2005) - R&R Alternative No. 46 - UK No. 72

Music videos

Song appearances in film and television
In 2004, their song "Stay Tuned" was used in the opening credits of the film P.S. In 2008, their song "Heavy Lifting" was featured in a scene of the film Forgetting Sarah Marshall. In 2010, their song "Sugar Pill" was featured in a scene of the film Takers. The introduction to "Stay Where You Are" was used in the season 2 episode of Grey's Anatomy, "As We Know It".

References

External links
 Ambulance LTD on Myspace
 LP reviews
 Interview about The Red Romance on BYT

TVT Records artists
Indie rock musical groups from New York (state)
Musical groups from Harlem